La Colombe (The Dove) is an opéra comique in two acts by Charles Gounod with a libretto by Jules Barbier and Michel Carré based on the poem Le Faucon by Jean de la Fontaine. It premiered in a one-act version at the Theater der Stadt in Baden-Baden on 3 August 1860, where it was well received and performed four times.  It was revived on 7 June 1866 by the Opéra-Comique at the Salle Favart in Paris in an expanded two-act version with additional music by Gounod.

Performance history
Gounod's previous opera, Philémon et Baucis, also with a text by Barbier and Carré based on a story by La Fontaine, had originally been commissioned for the summer season of 1859 by Édouard Bénazet, the director of the theatre and casino at Baden-Baden.  When the political situation between France and Germany deteriorated in June, Gounod's opera was preemptively withdrawn to avoid potential negative reaction from German audiences, and it ended up being premiered in an expanded form in February by Léon Carvalho at the Théâtre Lyrique in Paris. To compensate Bénazet for his loss, Gounod quickly composed La colombe during a two-week period for the following summer. (The score is dedicated to Bénazet.) Although it received an ovation in Baden-Baden, it did not do particularly well in its expanded version in the 1866 revival at the Opéra-Comique, receiving a total of only 29 performances. It was presented in Brussels on 5 December 1867, in Stockholm in Swedish on 11 February 1868, at the Crystal Palace in London on 20 September 1870 (as The Pet Dove in an English translation by H. B. Farnie), in Copenhagen in Danish on 27 April 1873 and Prague in Czech on 22 September 1873. It was presented in Bologna in Italian and again in Paris in French in 1912. Diaghilev presented it on 1 January 1923 in Monte Carlo, with recitatives composed by the 24-year-old Francis Poulenc replacing the spoken dialogue.

In the 21st century, La colombe was performed in 2013 in Siena and in Buxton, and also in Paris in 2014.

The opera includes a dugazon trouser role for the valet, Mazet, and Maitre Jean has a bass aria ("Le grand art de la cuisine") on the past glories of the kitchen that still turns up in recital occasionally.

Roles

Synopsis

The opera takes place in Florence. Sylvie, jealous of a social rival's parrot, pays a visit to Horace in hopes of obtaining his prize dove. The love-stricken admirer has fallen on hard times and resolves to roast and eat the bird. A happier ending for the bird than La Fontaine's is arranged.

Recordings

References
Notes

Sources
 Gounod, Charles ([1866]). La colombe, opéra-comique en 2 actes de MM. J. Barbier et M. Carré, piano-vocal score. Paris: Choudens. File #70753 at IMSLP.
 Gounod, Jean-Pierre (2000). "La Colombe", essay in the booklet included with Malibran CDRG 161.
 Holden, Amanda, editor (2001). The New Penguin Opera Guide. London: Penguin Books.  (paperback).
 Huebner, Steven (1990). The Operas of Charles Gounod. Oxford: Oxford University Press. .
 Huebner, Steven (2001). "Charles Gounod" in Holden 2001, pp. 334–340.
 Letellier, Robert Ignatius (2010). Opéra-Comique: A Sourcebook. Newcastle upon Tyne: Cambridge Scholars. .
 Loewenberg, Alfred (1978). Annals of Opera 1597–1940 (third edition, revised). Totowa, New Jersey: Rowman and Littlefield. .
 Wild, Nicole; Charlton, David (2005). Théâtre de l'Opéra-Comique Paris: répertoire 1762-1972. Sprimont, Belgium: Editions Mardaga. .

External links
Libretto in French at the Google Books
La Fontaine's The Falcon at Project Gutenberg

Operas
1860 operas
French-language operas
Operas by Charles Gounod
Opéras comiques
Libretti by Jules Barbier
Libretti by Michel Carré